Casual Corner was an American retail clothing chain founded in 1950. It operated stores under the names Casual Corner, Petite Sophisticate and August Max Woman brands, among others, with more than 525 stores at its peak.

History
In 1950, childhood friends Charles E. Carples, a Sage-Allen manager, and Brown-Thomson buyer Stanley W. Vogel each borrowed $5,000 to co-found Casual Corner, opening its first retail store that April Fools Day in West Hartford, Connecticut. The first shop was 750 square feet, employed poles beams, and nets from old tobacco barns, as well as the founders' spouses as staff. 

Opened during a time in history when a paired blouse and skirt was an avant-garde fashion trend. Casual Corner broke with tradition, allowing women to physically browse among and don clothes in fitting rooms, rather than encasing apparel under glass, and chose its name, in part, to reflect a more casual shopping experience than was typical of the era.

Throughout the 1950s. each store displayed the following poem near its front door:
Come in and browse and tarry and chat
Casual Corner is meant just for that
Come in and leisurely look awhile
And find here what’s good and fine in style
And if you wish your business we’ll tend
Come in as a stranger—leave as a friend.

In its first year, company sales were $45,000; a decade later, annual revenue had increased to $2 million. In 1969, annual sales were reported as $14 million. Casual Corner was sold to United States Shoe Corporation (U.S. Shoe) in 1970, when the chain included 20 stores. Cofounder Vogel became president of the company's specialty retail division, retiring a decade later.

A year after acquisition by U.S. Shoe, the chain opened its twenty-fifth store and continued to grow rapidly after that. Many of the original stores were constructed by George Zunner III of West Hartford, including those in Warwick and Providence, Rhode Island; Boston and Springfield, Massachusetts; Buffalo, New York; and at least one store in Ohio.

Under U.S. Shoe's ownership, Casual Corner became the foundation of a larger holding company, Women's Specialty Retailing Group. During its market height, in 1989, US Specialty Retailing included over 1,500 stores nationwide.

In April 1995, Luxottica purchased U.S. Shoe for $1.4 billion with the goal of acquiring its LensCrafters division. Losses of $US 22 million were reported that second quarter and, in October 1995, Luxottica spun off the Women's Specialty Retailing Group, renamed Casual Corner Grou, to Italian-controlled pLa Leonardo Finanziaria S.r.l., a Delaware company operated by Luxottica founder Leonardo Del Vecchio and his family. With 525 stores operating in 2000, Casual Corner closed its remaining locations in late 2005, after selling them to a liquidator, due to increased competition.

Brands and market
The chain's target demographic was originally sportswear for women, but by the 1990s it had been redesigned to target working women. As Women's Specialty Retailing Group, the company owned and operated Casual Corner as well as several other brands, including August Max and Sophisticated Woman (subsequently merged and rebranded as August Max Woman); Petite Sophisticate; Ups & Down; J. Riggings (menswear, sold in 1987); Caren Charles; and Casual Corner Annex.

References

1950 establishments in Connecticut
Defunct clothing retailers of the United States
Defunct companies based in Connecticut
American companies established in 1950
Retail companies established in 1950
Retail companies disestablished in 2005
2005 disestablishments in Connecticut